Dino Mangiero is a retired professional American football player who played defensive lineman for six seasons for the Kansas City Chiefs, Seattle Seahawks, and New England Patriots.

See also
Staten Island Sports Hall of Fame

References

1958 births
American football defensive linemen
Kansas City Chiefs players
Seattle Seahawks players
New England Patriots players
American people of Italian descent
Rutgers Scarlet Knights football players
Living people